Yang Ming is a Chinese kickboxer. As of October 2022, he is ranked as the tenth(10th) best super bantamweight kickboxer in the world by Beyond Kick.

Kickboxing career
Ming faced the 2015 K-1 Super Bantamweight champion Takeru Segawa at Rizin World Grand Prix 2015: Part 2 - Iza on December 31, 2015. Takeru won the fight by a second-round knockout, dropping Ming with a right cross in the last seconds of the round.

Ming faced Vladimir Litkyn at Wu Lin Feng 2020: WLF World Championship in Baise on January 18, 2020. He won the fight by a second-round technical knockout. Ming would go on to win his next seven bout was well, most notably beating Zhao Jianfeng at Wu Lin Feng 2020: China New Kings Tournament Final on August 29, to capture the Wu Lin Feng China and IPCC China -60kg titles, before he was booked to face Zhang Lanpei in his ninth and final fight of the year. His winning streak was snapped, as Lanpei won the bout by decision.

Ming participated in the 2022 Wu Ling Feng -60 kg tournament, the finals of which was held at Wu Lin Feng 528 on March 26, 2022. Although Ming won the semifinal bout against Zhao Boshi, he lost a decision in turn to Huang Shuailu in the finals. Ming previously beat Shuailu in the finals of the Contender League on January 1, 2022, but was unable to replicate that performance in their rubber match.

Ming faced Pinpetch Banchamek at Wu Lin Feng 533: China vs Thailand on February 3, 2023. He won the fight by a closely contested decision.

Titles and accomplishments

Professional
Wu Lin Feng
 2020 Wu Lin Feng China -60kg ChampionInternational Professional Combat Council 2020 IPCC China -60kg ChampionChinese Muay Thai Professional League 2019 China Muay Thai Professional League -60kg ChampionBangla Stadium 2016 Bangla Stadium ChampionWorld Boxing Council Muaythai 2015 WBC Muay Thai 135 lbs Intercontinental Champion

Amateur
 2014 China Muay Thai Championship -57kg runner-up
 2015 China Kickboxing Championship -60kg runner-up
 2015 China Muay Thai Championship -57kg runner-up
 2016 China Muay Thai Championship -57kg champion
 2016 East Asia Muay Thai Championship -57kg runner-up
 2017 China Muay Thai Championship -60kg runner-up
 2018 China Muay Thai Championship -60kg Champion
 2019 China Kickboxing Championship -60kg runner-up

Fight record

|-  style="background:#cfc;"
| 2023-02-03 || Win|| align=left| Pinpetch Banchamek  || Wu Lin Feng 533: China vs Thailand || Zhengzhou, China || Decision|| 3||3:00
|-  style="background:#fbb;"
| 2022-12-09 || Loss || align=left| Huang Shuailu  || Wu Lin Feng 532, Semi Final  || Zhengzhou, China || Decision || 3 ||3:00

|-  style="background:#cfc;"
| 2022-09-24 ||Win || align=left| Pan Jing ||  Wu Lin Feng 531|| Zhengzhou, China || Decision || 3 ||3:00

|-  style="background:#fbb;"
| 2022-03-26 || Loss|| align=left| Huang Shuailu || Wu Lin Feng 528, Final || Zhengzhou, China || Decision (Split) || 3||3:00

|-  style="background:#cfc;"
| 2022-03-26 || Win|| align=left| Zhao Boshi || Wu Lin Feng 528, Semi Final || Zhengzhou, China || Decision (Unanimous) || 3||3:00

|-  style="text-align:center; background:#cfc;"
| 2022-01-01 || Win|| align=left| Huang Shuailu  || Wu Lin Feng 2022, Contender League Final || Tangshan, China || Decision || 3 || 3:00

|-  style="text-align:center; background:#cfc;"
| 2021-09-25 || Win || align=left| Xue Shenzhen|| Wu Lin Feng 2021: WLF in Tangshan  || Tangshan, China ||  Decision (Unanimous)|| 3 ||3:00 

|-  style="text-align:center; background:#fbb;"
| 2021-05-29 ||Loss || align=left| Huang Shuailu || Wu Lin Feng 2021: World Contender League 4th Stage || China || Decision (Unanimous) || 3 || 3:00 

|-  style="text-align:center; background:#cfc;"
| 2021-03-27 ||Win || align=left| Li Yuankun || Wu Lin Feng 2021: World Contender League 1st Stage || China || Decision (Split) || 3 || 3:00 

|-  style="text-align:center; background:#fbb;"
| 2020-12-22|| Loss||align=left| Zhang Lanpei || Wu Lin Feng 2020: Women's 52kg Championship Tournament|| Zhengzhou, China || Decision|| 3 || 3:00 

|-  style="text-align:center; background:#cfc;"
| 2020-11-28|| Win||align=left| Wang Junyu || Wu Lin Feng 2020: China 70kg Championship Tournament|| Zhengzhou, China || Decision (Unanimous) || 3 || 3:00 

|-  style="text-align:center; background:#cfc;"
| 2020-10-16|| Win||align=left| Wei Weiyang || Wu Lin Feng 2020: China New Kings Champions Challenge match|| Hangzhou, China || Decision || 3 || 3:00 

|-  style="text-align:center; background:#cfc;"
| 2020-08-29|| Win||align=left| Zhao Jianfeng || Wu Lin Feng 2020: China New Kings Tournament Final|| Zhengzhou, China || Decision || 3 || 3:00 
|-
! style=background:white colspan=9 |

|-  style="text-align:center; background:#cfc;"
| 2020-08-03|| Win||align=left| Jin Hu || Wu Lin Feng 2020: King's Super Cup 4th Group Stage|| Zhengzhou, China || Decision || 3 || 3:00 

|-  style="text-align:center; background:#cfc;"
| 2020-07-05|| Win||align=left| Xue Shenzen || Wu Lin Feng 2020: King's Super Cup 3rd Group Stage|| Zhengzhou, China || Decision || 3 || 3:00 

|-  style="text-align:center; background:#cfc;"
| 2020-06-13|| Win||align=left| Zhao Jiangfeng || Wu Lin Feng 2020: King's Super Cup 2nd Group Stage|| Zhengzhou, China || Decision || 3 || 3:00 

|-  style="text-align:center; background:#cfc;"
| 2020-05-15|| Win||align=left| Zhao Zhanshi || Wu Lin Feng 2020: King's Super Cup 1st Group Stage|| Zhengzhou, China || Decision (Unanimous)|| 3 || 3:00 

|-  style="text-align:center; background:#cfc;"
| 2020-01-18|| Win||align=left| Vladimir Litkyn	 || Wu Lin Feng 2020: WLF World Championship in Baise|| Baise, China || TKO (Punches)|| 2 || 2:00 

|-  style="text-align:center; background:#fbb;"
| 2019-12-14|| Loss||align=left| James Georgiou || Wu Lin Feng 2019: East vs West Series - China vs Canada|| Markham, Ontario, Canada || Decision || 3 || 3:00 

|-  style="background:#fbb;"
| 2019-10-26 || Loss || align=left| Feng Tianhao|| Faith Fighting Championships 31 || Xi'an, China || Decision || 3 || 3:00

|-  style="text-align:center; background:#cfc;"
| 2019-09-06|| Win||align=left| Taher Nadei || Wu Lin Feng 2019: WLF at Lumpinee - China vs Thailand|| Bangkok, Thailand || TKO || 2 || 

|-  style="text-align:center; background:#cfc;"
| 2019-08-11|| Win||align=left| Dong Jian ||Faith Fight || China || Decision || 3 || 3:00 

|-  style="text-align:center; background:#fbb;"
| 2019-06-16|| Loss||align=left| Kongphonlek ||Dream Hero|| China || Decision || 3 || 3:00 

|-  style="text-align:center; background:#cfc;"
| 2019-01-20|| Win||align=left| Fan Yuelong ||WKFC China Muay Thai Professional League || China || Decision  || 3 || 3:00 

|-  style="text-align:center; background:#fbb;"
| 2018-12-08|| Loss ||align=left| Choodcho Tor.Laksong|| Wu Lin Feng 2018: WLF x S1 - China vs Thailand|| Thailand || Decision|| 3|| 3:00

|-  style="text-align:center; background:#fbb;"
| 2018-09-01|| Loss||align=left| Javad Heidari || Wu Lin Feng 2018: WLF -67kg World Cup 2018-2019 3rd Round|| Zhengzhou, China || Decision || 3 || 3:00 

|-  style="text-align:center; background:#cfc;"
| 2018-06-16|| Win||align=left| Dong Jian ||WKFC China Muay Thai Professional League || China || TKO (Doctor Stoppage)|| 3 ||  

|-  style="text-align:center; background:#cfc;"
| 2018-06-02|| Win||align=left| Yao Hefei ||Wu Lin Feng New Generation || Zhong County, China || Decision|| 3 || 3:00  

|-  style="text-align:center; background:#fbb;"
| 2017-07-09|| Loss ||align=left| Rodtang Jitmuangnon || Topking World Series - EM Legend 21 || China || KO (Body punches)|| 2 ||  

|-  style="text-align:center; background:#fbb;"
| 2015-12-31||| Loss ||align=left| Takeru || Rizin World Grand Prix 2015: Part 2 - Iza || Saitama, Japan || KO (Right Cross)|| 2 || 2:59

|-  style="text-align:center; background:#cfc;"
| 2015-11-28|| Win||align=left|  || Kung Fu Fighting Ultimate Legend || Tianjin, China ||  ||  || 

|-  style="text-align:center; background:#cfc;"
| 2015-10-06|| Win||align=left| Tata || Bullet Fight Club International Championship || Xianghe County, China || TKO || 3 || 
|-
! style=background:white colspan=9 |

|-  style="text-align:center; background:#fbb;"
| 2015-06-11|| Loss ||align=left| Ji Wenhao ||Final Legend ||  Macao || Decision || 3 || 3:00 

|-  style="text-align:center; background:#cfc;"
| 2015-05-08|| Win||align=left| Suosongchai || Hero Legends - China vs Thailand Tournament, Final ||  China || Decision (Unanimous) || 3 || 3:00 

|-  style="text-align:center; background:#cfc;"
| 2015-05-08|| Win||align=left| Wisa Sodiplas || Hero Legends - China vs Thailand Tournament, Semi Final ||  China || TKO || 1 ||  

|-
| colspan=9 | Legend:    

|-  style="text-align:center; background:#fbb;"
| 2017-05-05|| Loss||align=left| Stanislav Gazitov || 2017 IFMA World Championship, Round of 16 ||  Minsk, Belarus || Decision ||  ||  

|-
| colspan=9 | Legend''':

References 

Chinese male kickboxers
1995 births
Living people